Vladimír Rusnák (born 3 August 1950) is a Slovak former football player and former manager of MŠK Tesla Stropkov.

References

External links
 MFK Ružomberok profile

1950 births
Living people
Slovak footballers
Slovak football managers
Slovak expatriate footballers
1. FC Tatran Prešov players
FK Dubnica players
Slovak Super Liga managers
Expatriate footballers in the Czech Republic
FC DAC 1904 Dunajská Streda managers
MFK Ružomberok managers
Association footballers not categorized by position
AS Trenčín players
MŠK Tesla Stropkov players
People from Stropkov
Sportspeople from the Prešov Region
MŠK Žilina players